
Gmina Grzmiąca is a rural gmina (administrative district) in Szczecinek County, West Pomeranian Voivodeship, in north-western Poland.

Villages
Gmina Grzmiąca contains the villages and settlements of Boleszkowice, Czechy, Gdaniec, Glewo, Godzisław, Grzmiąca, Grzmiączka, Iwin, Kamionka, Klepary, Kłośno, Krosino, Lubogoszcz, Mieszałki, Nosibądy, Owczary, Przeradz, Przystawy, Pustkowie, Radomyśl, Radostowo, Radusz, Równe, Sławno, Storkowo, Strzeszyn, Sucha, Świętno, Ubocze, Wielanowo, Wielawino, Żarnowo and Zwartowo.

Neighbouring gminas
Gmina Grzmiąca is bordered by the gminas of Barwice, Bobolice, Borne Sulinowo, Szczecinek and Tychowo.

References
Polish official population figures 2006

Grzmiaca
Szczecinek County